The Myanmar women's national under-20 team is a national association football youth team of Myanmar and is controlled by the Myanmar Football Federation.

AFC U-19 Women's Championship

  2002 = Group Stage
  2004,  2006 = Did not Qualify
  2007 = Group Stage
  2011 = Did not Qualify
  2013 = Group Stage
  2015,  2017 = Did not Qualify
  2019 = Group Stage

U-20
Asian women's national under-20 association football teams